Inga is a city of Kongo Central province in the Democratic Republic of the Congo. As of 2012, it had an estimated population of 10,887.

References 

Populated places in Kongo Central